Homestead Records was a Long Island, New York-based sublabel of music distributor Dutch East India Trading that operated from 1983 to 1996. The label was known for not paying its artists and not spending any money on promotion.

History
The label was created and named by Sam Berger while he worked as the American Independent buyer at Dutch East India. Berger saw that many bands had already recorded tapes ready to be put out and just needed somebody to press them and distribute them. He came to Dutch East owner Barry Tenenbaum who agreed to the venture. Tennenbaum had  started a mail-order business, called Lord Sitar Records, from his bedroom when he was a teenager, importing records by the Beatles and other artists from England that he could sell for a profit in the States.  Tenenbaum had established an extensive distribution network, called Dutch East India Trading, so when the Copyright Act of 1976 curtailed his ability to import artists who already had U.S. labels, he began licensing records for release and he created the Homestead Records imprint for this purpose.  

Berger left Homestead in 1984 and was replaced by Gerard Cosloy, the creator of the underground art fanzine Conflict. Cosloy would be the sole employee of the label until 1987 when Craig Marks was hired to assist him in running the label. Cosloy and Marks both resigned in 1990. Ken Katkin was the manager from 1990 to 1992, and Steven Joerg from 1992 to 1996.  The label closed in 1996 with its last release being Ivo Perelman's Cama de Terra.

Artists

 Antietam
 Babe the Blue Ox
 Bastro
 Beat Happening
 Beat Temptation
 Big Black
 Big Dipper
 Bloodsport
 Bodeco
 Brainiac
 Bratmobile
 Breaking Circus
 Bull
 David S. Ware
 Daniel Johnston
 Death Of Samantha
 Dinosaur Jr
 Dredd Foole & the Din
 Einstürzende Neubauten
 Elliott Sharp
 Enrico Curreri
 Fish & Roses
 GG Allin
 Giant Sand
 Great Plains
 Green River
 Happy Flowers
 Honor Role
 Ivo Perelman
 King Kong
 Live Skull
 Love Child
 My Dad Is Dead
 Naked Raygun
 New Radiant Storm King (NRSK)
 Nice Strong Arm
 Nick Cave and the Bad Seeds
 One Plus Two
 OWT
 Phantom Tollbooth
 Pony
 Salem 66
 Screaming Trees
 Seam
 Sebadoh
 Sleepyhead
 Smack Dab
 Sonic Youth
 Sorry
 Soul-Junk
 Squirrel Bait
 Stratotanker
 SSD
 Supreme Dicks
 Swans
 Table
 Tall Dwarfs
 The Blackjacks
 The Cakekitchen
 The Chills
 The Dentists
 The Dogmatics
 The Ex
 The Flies
 The Frogs
 The Hedonists
 The Holy Men
 The Mad Scene
 The Meatmen
 The Membranes
 The Micronotz
 The Outnumbered
 The Pastels
 The Proletariat
 The Verlaines
 Thomas Jefferson Slave Apartments
 Trumans Water
 Tsunami
 U-Men
 Uzi
 Volcano Suns
 Weird Paul Petroskey
 William Hooker
 William Parker
 Wombats

See also 
 List of record labels
 Matador Records

References

External links
 Label discography

Record labels established in 1983
Record labels disestablished in 1996
American independent record labels
Industrial record labels
Post-hardcore record labels
Noise music record labels
Experimental music record labels
Alternative rock record labels
Defunct record labels of the United States